Impediment to expulsion, or prohibition of deportation, are practical or legal barriers that prevents a country from enforcing an expulsion or deportation decision of a non-national. In some countries and cases, a person who has been asylum seeker but has received negative decision, may still be entitled to reside in the country where the person has applied for a residence permit due to such impediments, and may get a temporary or permanent residence permit. In other countries and cases, the person would be considered an undocumented (also known as illegal or irregular) immigrant, or may be in an undefined legal state.

Examples of impediments to expulsion in certain countries are:
 The home country refuses to receive the person.
 The  foreigner's identity was not established. 
 Transport is not possible.
 Serious difficulties would arise due to the foreigner's health condition 
 New asylum reasons occur after the deportation decision, with reference to the principle of non-refoulement in the international Refugee Convention. The European Court of Human Rights, referring to the European Convention on Human Rights, has shown in a number of indicative judgments that there are enforcement barriers to expulsion to certain countries, for example due to the risk of torture.

References

Immigration law